Pasley (formerly known as Milwaukee or Millowakee) is an unincorporated community in Barry County, Missouri, United States. Pasley was originally known as Milwaukee after a store in the community; after a fire destroyed the store in the 1930s, the name was changed to Pasley for a local school.

Notes

Unincorporated communities in Barry County, Missouri
Unincorporated communities in Missouri